Mosquito/See Through is the eighth album by Australian improvised music trio The Necks first released as a 2-CD set on the Fish of Milk label in 2004 and later on the ReR label internationally. The album features two hour-long tracks, titled "Mosquito" and "See Through", performed by Chris Abrahams, Lloyd Swanton and Tony Buck.

Reception
The Wire review rated the album "Among the Necks recordings you actually would go back to rescue from a house fire".

Track listing 
All compositions by Chris Abrahams, Tony Buck and Lloyd Swanton

Disc one
 "Mosquito" – 61:43

Disc two
 "See Through" – 61:47

Personnel 
Chris Abrahams – piano
Lloyd Swanton – bass
Tony Buck – drums

References 

2004 albums
APRA Award winners
Jazz albums by Australian artists
The Necks albums